James Michael Flanigan Jr. (born August 27, 1971) is a former American football defensive tackle that played in the National Football League from 1994–2003.  Most of his success came when he was with the Chicago Bears from 1994–2000.  He played college football at the University of Notre Dame.  His father, Jim Flanigan, Sr., also played in the NFL for the Green Bay Packers.  Flanigan also played for the Philadelphia Eagles, the Green Bay Packers and the San Francisco 49ers during his NFL career.

During his tenure with the Chicago Bears, primarily as a defensive tackle, he also saw limited action on offense as a tight end in short-yardage situations. From the 1994 thru 1996 seasons, he made 4 receptions for 4 touchdowns. He also caught a surprise pass for the first 2-point conversion in Bears' history on September 1, 1997 against the Green Bay Packers.

References

1971 births
Living people
Sportspeople from Green Bay, Wisconsin
People from Door County, Wisconsin
American football defensive tackles
Notre Dame Fighting Irish football players
Chicago Bears players
Green Bay Packers players
San Francisco 49ers players
Philadelphia Eagles players
Players of American football from Wisconsin